New York Open may refer to:

 New York Open (tennis), ATP World Tour event
 Bellevue Country Club Open, also entitled the New York State Open, PGA Tour-level event in 1920 and 1921
 New York State Open (1920s event), PGA Tour-level event from 1928 to 1930
 New York State Open, contemporary state open

See also
 Open New York